Eric Palante (21 January 1963 – ) was a Belgian motorcycle off-road rally racer.

Born in Liège, Palante had been passionate about rally riding since childhood.

Palante was found dead at the fifth stage of the Dakar Rally on 10 January 2014, aged 50, in Chilecito, La Rioja Province, Argentina. It was his eleventh time competing in the off-road race. He was survived by his wife and their five children.

References

1963 births
2014 deaths
Sportspeople from Liège
Belgian motocross riders
Off-road motorcycle racers
Belgian rally drivers
Enduro riders
Dakar Rally drivers
Motorcycle racers who died while racing